R. v. Gonzales (1962), 37 C.R. 56, was a landmark decision by the British Columbia Court of Appeal holding that Section 94(a) of the Indian Act did not violate the respondent's equality before the law, guaranteed under section 1(b) of the Canadian Bill of Rights, because all Indians were treated in the same way. Gonzales is particularly famous for employing the similarly situated test, which was not used in R. v. Drybones and was explicitly rejected by the Supreme Court of Canada in Andrews v. Law Society of British Columbia.

See also
R. v. Drybones
Andrews v. Law Society of British Columbia
The Canadian Crown and First Nations, Inuit and Métis
 Canadian Aboriginal case law
Numbered Treaties
Indian Act
Section Thirty-five of the Constitution Act, 1982
Indian Health Transfer Policy (Canada)

External links 
Text of the British Columbia Court of Appeal Decision in the Dominion Law Reports hosted by the University of Saskatchewan

Canadian Aboriginal case law
1962 in Canadian case law